Hey Girl! is a 2007 play by Italian director Romeo Castellucci.  According to theatre critic Neil Genzlinger, Hey Girl! is a series of stage tableaux devoted to women or, more precisely, the history of the oppression of women."

References

External links 
  Seattle Times With Hey Girl, theater company evokes confusion of girlhood.
 Walker Art Center Romeo Castellucci and Societas Raffaello Sanzio: Hey Girl! 
 New York Times, February 3, 2008, A Director With a Bent for the Visceral, Tom Sellar.

Postmodern plays
2008 plays
Italian plays